Derrick Arthur Köhn (born 4 February 1999) is a German professional footballer who plays as a defender for Hannover 96.

International career
Born in Germany, Köhn is of Ghanaian descent. He is a youth international for Germany.

Career statistics

Club

References

External links
 

1999 births
Living people
Footballers from Hamburg
German footballers
Association football defenders
Germany youth international footballers
German sportspeople of Ghanaian descent
2. Bundesliga players
3. Liga players
Regionalliga players
Eredivisie players
Hamburger SV players
FC Bayern Munich footballers
FC Bayern Munich II players
Willem II (football club) players
Hannover 96 players
German expatriate footballers
German expatriate sportspeople in the Netherlands
Expatriate footballers in the Netherlands